François Lellorquis de Malmédy (circa 1750November 1781), the Marquis de Malmédy, (also known as François Malmédy-Gray), possibly a son of Charles-François de Gray de Malmédy and his wife Marie Charlotte Sébastienne Le Masson de Vandelincourt,  was a sous lieutenant of cavalry in the French Army prior to 1776 and a Continental Army officer during the American Revolution after he arrived in the American colonies in 1776.  He was reported to be descended from a Scottish family named Gray that settled in France.

Revolutionary War service
Malmédy was hot headed and arrogant, refusing to take assignments that he felt were beneath him, as seen in his letters to General Washington.
 19 September 1776, brevet major in the Rhode Island Line Continental Army
 November 7, 1776, appointed brigadier general in Rhode Island
 December 1776, brigadier general, chief engineer and director of defense works in the Rhode Island Militia
 10 May 1777, given a Continental commission as colonel
 June 1778, at Battle of Monmouth under Major General Charles Lee
 20 Jun 1779, commanded a light infantry company at the Battle of Stono Ferry
 8 September 1781, commanded the North Carolina Light Dragoons Regiment  at Battle of Eutaw Springs
 November 1781, killed in a duel by Maj. Smith Snead of Virginia at the High Hills of Santee in Sumter County, South Carolina

References

Bibliography
  
 
 Bartlett, John Russell. Records of the Colony of Rhode Island and Providence Plantations, in New England. 10 vols. Providence: A. C. Greene, 1856–1865.
 Bodinier, André. Dictionnaire des officiers de l'armée royale qui ont combattu aux Etats-Unis pendant la guerre d'Indépendance 1776–1783. Vincennes, France: Service historique de l'armée, 5th edition 2010.
 Greene, Nathanael. The Papers of Nathanael Greene. Edited by Richard K. Showman, et al. 11 vols. to date. Chapel Hill: University of North Carolina Press, 1976–.
 Lee, Charles. Papers of Charles Lee. 4 vols. New-York Historical Society Collections 4-7 (1871–1874).
 ; “To George Washington from François, Marquis de Malmedy, 20 November 1778,” Founders Online, National Archives, version of January 18, 2019, https://founders.archives.gov/documents/Washington/03-18-02-0247. [Original source: The Papers of George Washington, Revolutionary War Series, vol. 18, 1 November 1778 – 14 January 1779, ed. Edward G. Lengel. Charlottesville: University of Virginia Press, 2008, pp. 234–235.]
 , August 04, 1780, Colonial and State Records of North Carolina, Volume 14, Page 531
 

  
Continental Army officers from France
French military officers
Rhode Island militiamen in the American Revolution
American duellists
Duelling fatalities
 1781 deaths
French duellists